Carex ferruginea, the rusty sedge or rust-coloured sedge, is a species of flowering plant in the family Cyperaceae. It is native to the Alps, the southern Carpathians, and the western Balkan Peninsula, and has been introduced to the U.S. state of New Jersey. It is a glacial relict species.

References

ferruginea
Flora of France
Flora of Switzerland
Flora of Germany
Flora of Austria
Flora of Southeastern Europe
Plants described in 1771
Flora of the Alps
Flora of the Carpathians